The 1995 Kansas State Wildcats football team represented Kansas State University in the 1995 NCAA Division I-A football season.  The team's head football coach was Bill Snyder.  The Wildcats played their home games in KSU Stadium.  1995 saw the Wildcats finish with a record of 10–2, and a 5–2 record in Big 8 Conference play.  1995 was the last year of the Big Eight.  The next year was the inaugural season of the Big 12 Conference.

The season culminated with a victory against Colorado State in the 1995 Holiday Bowl.  The 10-win season was the first for Kansas State since 1910, and the final top-10 ranking was the first in program history.

The Wildcats finished the 1995 season leading NCAA Division I-A in total defense, and also shut out three opponents for the first time in school history.  The team shut out Akron, Northern Illinois, and Missouri.  The Wildcats later repeated the feat in 1999 and 2002.

Schedule

Roster

Rankings

Game summaries

at Nebraska

Kansas

Colorado

vs. Colorado State (Holiday Bowl)

References

Kansas State
Kansas State Wildcats football seasons
Holiday Bowl champion seasons
Kansas State Wildcats football